Scalicus hians is a species of marine ray-finned fish belonging to the family Peristediidae, the armoured gurnards or armored sea robins. This species is found in western Pacific Ocean.

Taxonomy
Scalicus hians was first formally described as Peristedion hians in 1897 by the American scientists Charles Henry Gilbert & Frank Cramer with the type locality given as the Hawaiian Islands. Some authorities regard S. amiscus as a junior synonym of S. hians. The specific name hians means “gaping” or “open”, it is not clear what this alludes to nor was it explained by Gilbert and Cramer.

Description

Distribution and habitat
Scalicus hians is found in the western Pacific Ocean off southern Japan, the South China Sea and in the central western Pacific in Hawaii. It is a benthic species of sandy substrates at depths between

References 

hians
Fish of the Pacific Ocean
Fish described in 1897
Taxa named by Frank Cramer
Taxa named by Charles Henry Gilbert